Renal & Urology News is an online medical news website and monthly print publication based in New York City that reports on clinical news for nephrologists and urologists with coverage focusing on medical conferences and papers in peer-reviewed journals.

Background
Launched in 2002, Renal & Urology News is owned by Haymarket Medical, a subsidiary of Haymarket Media.

Sources cited

American medical websites
Nephrology journals
Urology journals
Companies based in New York City
Newspapers published in New York City
Publications established in 2002
2002 establishments in New York City